Louis Georges Érasme, marquis de Contades (1704–1795) was the 6th Marquis de Contades and Seigneur de Montgeoffroi. He was a Marshal of France and a major battlefield commander during the Seven Years' War. He notably commanded the French forces at the 1759 Battle of Minden.

He was born in Gizeux, Anjou, the son of Gaspard de Contades (b.1666) and his wife Jeanne-Marie Crespin de La Chabosselaye. On 1734, he was created a Brigadier; in 1740 Maréchal de camp; and in 1745 Lieutenant Général. He took command of the French Army of Westphalia in 1758 during the Seven Years' War due to dissatisfaction with the previous commanders. He was unable to stem the French withdrawal across the Rhine, which had undone France's conquest of Hanover. On 24 August 1758, he was created Maréchal de France. On 1 August 1759, he led the French forces at the Battle of Minden, where they were routed. This largely halted France's offensive in Germany that year, and had wider strategic ramifications. He was subsequently relieved of his command. He died at Livry.

Family
In October 1724, he married Marie-Françoise Magon, daughter of François Magon, with issue:
Françoise-Gertrude de Contades
Georges Gaspard François Auguste Jean Baptiste de Contades (b.1726), who succeeded his father as the 7th Marquis de Contades
Adrien-Maurice de Contades (b.1736)

About 1737, he had an affair with Marie-Hélène Moreau de Séchelles, resulting in issue:
Jean-Baptiste Martin Hérault de Séchelles (the father of Marie-Jean Hérault de Séchelles)

1704 births
1795 deaths
People from Indre-et-Loire
Marshals of France
Marquesses of Contades